The Isotta Fraschini Tipo KM is a luxury car produced between 1910-1914 in Italy. Only 50 were built. Many of those 50 examples were exported to the United States, where the company had a branch on New York's Broadway.

The KM was introduced in Paris in 1910. It was one of the most powerful cars at that time. It has a 10.6 litre engine, with power transferred via chain. It has brakes on all four wheels, and a system developed by Oreste Fraschini allows for using front or rear brakes individually.

There were two engine options -Italian 100/120 hp or American 140 hp, top speed 130 km/h or 160 km/h with the American option being more powerful.

Engine 
The engine was an advanced single overhead camshaft four, benefiting company’s experience in the new technology of aeroengine design and manufacture, with bi-block cylinders, four big valves per cylinder and lightweight construction.

Performance 
Pioneer motor racer Charles Jarrott named the 100-hp Isotta Fraschini as ‘tops’ of the pre-1914 sports cars. Performance was in keeping with the price demanded: in 1913 the famed racing driver Ray Gilhooley lapped the Indianapolis Brickyard oval in 1 minute 52 seconds, six seconds faster than the average of that year’s “500” winner, at the wheel of a stock-bodied 1912 Tipo KM complete with windshield, spare tires and fenders, and with four passengers aboard.

See also 

 Timeline of most powerful production cars

Notes 

KM
Cars introduced in 1910
Vintage vehicles